Enzo Di Gianni (June 26, 1908 – March 3, 1975) was an Italian screenwriter, producer and film director.

Selected filmography
 Destiny (1951)
 Repentance (1952)
 Milanese in Naples (1954)

References

Bibliography 
 Emiliano Morreale. Così piangevano: il cinema melò nell'Italia degli anni Cinquanta. Donzelli Editore, 2011.

External links 
 

1908 births
1975 deaths
20th-century Italian screenwriters
Italian film directors
Italian film producers
Film people from Naples
Italian male screenwriters
20th-century Italian male writers